Agrostis canina, the velvety bentgrass, brown bent or velvet bent, is a species of grass in the family Poaceae.

Description

It is frequently confused with Agrostis vinealis (formerly treated as a subspecies or variety of A. canina), which grows in more upland habitats and has rhizomes rather than stolons.

Distribution and ecology
The range of Agrostis canina covers most of Europe and temperate parts of Asia, and extends from sea level to the alpine zone. It has also been introduced to eastern North America, Hawaii, Algeria and the Kerguelen Islands.

Agrostis canina is sensitive to drought, but is common in damp places, including ditches and lake margins.

The short, green growth of A. canina has made it popular as a lawn grass.

References

External links

canina
Grasses of Asia
Grasses of Europe
Flora of temperate Asia
Plants described in 1753
Taxa named by Carl Linnaeus
Least concern biota of Asia
Least concern biota of Oceania